Chaudhary Randhir Singh (born 1 July 1924 in [Bayanpur] - 2009) was an Indian freedom fighter and politician.

He was member of the Indian National Congress. Chaudhary Randhir was a member of the 4th Lok Sabha from the Rohtak constituency in Haryana.

He was lawyer and participated in popular agitations as well as mass movements and courted arrest seven times on public issues.

He was Governor of Sikkim from February 1996 to May 2001.

References 

People from Sonipat district
Indian National Congress politicians
India MPs 1967–1970
Lok Sabha members from Haryana
21st-century Indian politicians
Haryana politicians
1924 births
2009 deaths